Remi Luke Matthews (born 10 February 1994) is an English professional footballer who plays as a goalkeeper for Scottish Premiership club St Johnstone, on loan from Crystal Palace.

He began his career with Norwich City, but did not make a senior appearance. He was loaned to Scottish Premiership club Hamilton Academical and several English Football League teams, before joining Bolton permanently in January 2019. In 2020, he joined Sunderland on a one-year deal. In July 2021, Matthews signed for Crystal Palace on a two-year deal.

Career

Norwich City
Born in Gorleston, Norfolk, Matthews began his career at the academy of Norwich City. After an injury to their last loanee Chris Weale, Matthews was signed on a month-long loan by League Two team Burton Albion on 27 November 2014. Two days later, he was included in a matchday squad for the first time in his career, remaining an unused substitute in their 1–0 loss at Shrewsbury Town; this would happen four more times in his spell as he left without an appearance.

On 6 July 2015, Matthews returned to Burton, of League One, on loan until the next January. A week later, he signed a new two-year contract at his parent club. He made his professional debut on 8 August, a 2–1 win against Scunthorpe United at the Pirelli Stadium in Burton's first ever League One match. They ended the season with a second promotion.

After six games in all competitions, Matthews returned to Norwich. On 24 March 2016 he went back to League One, joining Doncaster Rovers for the rest of the season. He made his debut the following day in a 4–1 loss at Colchester United, and totalled nine games for the team from the Keepmoat Stadium, who ended the campaign with relegation.

On 16 July 2016, Matthews joined Scottish Premiership club Hamilton Academical on a season-long loan, having signed a new two-year contract, with the option of another year at Norwich. He made his debut the same day, as Hamilton lost 2–1 to Ayr United in the Scottish League Cup.

On 20 October 2017, Matthews was signed by League One club Plymouth Argyle on an emergency loan as Argyle had all three professional goalkeepers (Luke McCormick, Robbert te Loeke and Kyle Letheren) out injured, making his debut the next day in a 1–0 away win over AFC Wimbledon. Matthews returned to Norwich on 27 November after getting injured in a league game against Portsmouth.

On 29 December 2017, Matthews joined Argyle on loan for the second time in the same season. Initially on an emergency loan for just one game against Blackpool, it was extended in the January transfer window until the end of the season.

Bolton Wanderers
On 12 August 2018, Matthews joined Championship club Bolton Wanderers in an initial loan deal, with the move set to be made permanent in January 2019. However, on 5 January 2019, he returned to Norwich after the transfer fell through due to Bolton's transfer embargo. On 18 January, he joined on a permanent deal.

Matthews made his debut for the club on 14 August in a 2–1 loss at Leeds United in the first round of the EFL Cup.

On 17 September 2019, Matthews kept a clean sheet for Bolton Wanderers in a 0–0 draw with Oxford United. Making several crucial saves during the match. Bolton had been saved from liquidation mere days before. Matthews, assisted in gaining a much needed point for the side. Only their second of a troubled League One campaign in 2019. On 26 June it was announced Matthews would be one of 14 senior players released at the end of his contract on 30 June.

Sunderland 
Matthews joined Sunderland of League One on 21 August 2020 on a one-year deal. On 25 May 2021 it was announced that he would leave Sunderland at the end of the season, following the expiry of his contract.

Crystal Palace 
In July 2021, Matthews joined  club Crystal Palace on a two-year contract.

St Johnstone (loan)
Prior to the start of the 2022–23 season, Matthews was sent on a season-long loan to Scottish club St Johnstone.

Career statistics

Honours
Sunderland
EFL Trophy: 2020–21

References

External links

1994 births
Living people
People from Gorleston-on-Sea
English footballers
Association football goalkeepers
Norwich City F.C. players
Burton Albion F.C. players
Doncaster Rovers F.C. players
English Football League players
Hamilton Academical F.C. players
Bolton Wanderers F.C. players
Sunderland A.F.C. players
Scottish Professional Football League players
Crystal Palace F.C. players
St Johnstone F.C. players